Southampton is a village in the Town of Southampton in Suffolk County, on the South Fork of Long Island, in New York, United States. The population was 3,109 at the 2010 census.

The Incorporated Village of Southampton serves as the Town Seat of the Town of Southampton, and is the oldest and largest of communities in the summer colony known as The Hamptons.

History 

Southampton, settled in 1640 and incorporated as a village in 1894, historically began with a small group of English settlers who set sail from Lynn, Massachusetts, and landed on June 12, 1640, at what is now known as Conscience Point. It is the oldest English settlement in the state of New York and is named after the English Earl of Southampton.

The Shinnecock tribe welcomed the arrival of the white settlers in 1640 and not only gave them land to live on, "Olde Towne", but also shared with the settlers their knowledge of planting corn and fertilizing it with fish, growing crops, digging clams and scallops from nearby bays and trapping game.  During the 18th and 19th centuries, fishing, farming (especially potatoes and the local sweet corn) and duck raising were the predominant industries.

The early settlers, with the help of a resident Shinnecock Indian guide, were led over an old woodland trail that is now North Sea Road to an ideal spot for their first settlement. There, at the head of what today is Old Town Pond, they constructed their first homes. The Shinnecock Reservation, established in 1701, is one of the oldest Native American reservations in the United States.

A property called the Halsey House was a homestead by pioneer Thomas Halsey in 1640. A rare "first period" house was built in 1660 when Main Street, in the pioneer hamlet of Southampton, was first laid out. Its owner, Thomas Halsey, was one of the original families who bought property from the Shinnecocks in 1640. It is one of the oldest English-type frame houses in the state.

Summer Colony
Dr. Theodore Gaillard Thomas, a New York City physician is regarded at the founder of the resort community, also termed the Summer Colony, of Southampton.  He convinced a number of his wealthy clients about the beauty and potential restorative nature of the rural environment of Southampton.  His efforts to develop this resort community began in 1863.  He proved very successful at establishing what grew into a very prominent and affluent community of summer residents.  Dr. Thomas and his friends ultimately established many of the leading institutions in Southampton including  the St. Andrews Dune Church, the Shinnecock Golf Club, the Meadow Club, the Southampton Beach Club and The Parrish Art Museum (now located in Water Mill, NY).

Over time, several of the other villages and hamlets in what has become called the Hamptons increasingly became a haven for affluent summer season vacationers. Southampton Village, which hosted the earliest summer community of socially prominent residents and was arguably the center for upper class Americans, grew larger and faster than the others.  Southampton has served as home to members of the Ford, Du Pont, Morgan, Atterbury, Woolworth and Eisenhower families.

21st century
Southampton Village is regarded as one of the premier summer resort areas in the country. The community of summer residents occupy the top echelon of American social, political and financial circles.

Accordingly, real estate is extremely expensive in the village.  The Estate Section, which contains the majority of the homes for the very affluent residents, lies directly north of the Atlantic oceanfront and extends to Hill Street. Particular streets of note in the area include Ox Pasture Road, Halsey Neck Lane, Coopers Neck Lane, First Neck Lane and South Main Street. The homes around Lake Agawam, referred to by Dr. Thomas as "the very center of our Summer Colony" are particularly noteworthy for their architectural pedigree and historical provenance.

The oceanfront roads—Gin Lane and Meadow Lane—are generally the most expensive roads in the village.  Meadow Lane in particular has been called Billionaire Lane, and cited as having among the most expensive residential real estate in the country.

Other areas in the village house the relatively large population of year-round residents.  These neighborhoods extend from Hill Street northwards to Route 27, east to the hamlet of Water Mill, and west to the area of Tuckahoe in Southampton Town.

The Shinnecock Indian Reservation borders the village on its southwestern border. Shinnecock Hills Golf Club one of the oldest and most prestigious golf courses in the country, borders the village on its northwest corner.  The Art Village, a summer art school started by William Merritt Chase and funded by early residents of the Southampton Summer Colony, is still in existence, though now it is entirely private residences; no arts education is conducted in the Art Village any more.

There are several working farms and agricultural preserves in the village. Most of those properties are located in the Estate Section, particularly in the Wickapogue Road Historic District.

Southampton Village boasts well regarded ocean beaches including Cooper's Beach, which was voted #3 in a recent national poll. In 2010 it was listed as America's top beach according to the annual list of the best American beaches compiled by Dr. Stephen Leatherman, AKA Dr. Beach.

Geography

The village gained territory between the 1990 census and the 2000 census; the Southampton CDP that existed in 1990 was deleted and most of its territory went to two adjacent CDPs.

Demographics

2017 American Community Survey 
According to US Census estimates as of March 2017, there were 3,193 people in the village. The population density was 498.9 people per square mile (192.6/km2). The racial makeup of the village was 74.5% White, 16.7% Black or African American, 0.4% Native American, 3.60% Asian, 0.03% Pacific Islander, 4.40% from other races, and 0.90% from two or more races. Hispanic or Latino of any race were 22.5% of the population.

In the village, the population was spread out, with 16.2% under the age of 19, 1.7% from 18 to 24, 12.4% from 19 to 34, 39.8% from 35 to 64, and 29.9% who were 65 years of age or older. The median age was 55.2 years. The Village's residents were estimated to be 46% male and 54% female.

Also, as per the 2015 Census Data estimates, the median income for a household in the village was $96,250 and the median income for a family was $109,674.   Twenty two percent of the households in the Village earned over $200,000.

As per the 2000 Census, there were 1,651 households, out of which 21.9% had children under the age of 18 living with them, 42.1% were married couples living together, 12.1% had a female householder with no husband present, and 40.5% were non-families. 34.2% of all households were made up of individuals, and 15.4% had someone living alone who was 65 years of age or older. The average household size was 2.36 and the average family size was 2.97.

Census 2000 
As of the census of 2000, there were 3,965 people, 1,651 households, and 982 families residing in the village. The population density was 626.7 people per square mile (241.8/km²). There were 2,936 housing units at an average density of 464.0 per square mile (179.1/km²). The racial makeup of the village was 80.38% White, 12.94% Black or African American, 0.83% Native American, 1.59% Asian, 0.03% Pacific Islander, 1.97% from other races, and 2.27% from two or more races. Hispanic or Latino of any race were 9.05% of the population.

There were 1,651 households out of which 21.9% had children under the age of 18 living with them, 42.1% were married couples living together, 12.1% had a female householder with no husband present, and 40.5% were non-families. 34.2% of all households were made up of individuals and 15.4% had someone living alone who was 65 years of age or older. The average household size was 2.36 and the average family size was 2.97.

In the village the population was spread out with 19.5% under the age of 18, 7.3% from 18 to 24, 24.8% from 25 to 44, 27.2% from 45 to 64, and 21.1% who were 65 years of age or older. The median age was 44 years. For every 100 females there were 93.6 males. For every 100 females age 18 and over, there were 91.6 males.

The median income for a household in the village was $54,030, and the median income for a family was $61,016. Males had a median income of $40,729 versus $36,875 for females. The per capita income for the village was $37,015. About 1.3% of families and 6.2% of the population were below the poverty line, including 2.6% of those under age 18 and 3.9% of those age 65 or over.

Government 
As of September 2022, the Mayor Southampton is Jesse Warren, the Deputy Mayor is Gina Arresta, and the Village Trustees are Robin Brown, William "Bill" Manger Jr., and Roy Stevenson. 

At the time of Warren's election, the 37-year-old became the village's youngest mayor.

Village police 
This area is policed by the Southampton Village Police Department.

Historic districts
Beach Road Historic District
North Main Street Historic District
Southampton Village Historic District
Wickapogue Road Historic District

Notable residents 
Many wealthy and influential people have homes in the "estate section" of the village, the area immediately north of the Atlantic Ocean front. Southampton has historically been home to prominent residents including members of the Ford, Du Pont, Eisenhower, Vanderbilt and Morgan families. Today, the village is itself home to approximately half of the billionaires who have residences in the eight hamlets and villages that constitute the Hamptons. 

Other notable residents include:
 Tim Bishop, former U.S. Representative for New York's 1st congressional district
 Elizabeth Bogart, 19th-century poet
 Aby Rosen, real estate mogul
 Ian Schrager, hotelier
 Tory Burch, fashion designer, business woman, and philanthropist
 Brooke Shields, actress
 Amanda Clark, Olympic sailor
 Pyrrhus Concer, First African American whaler to reach restricted Japan and Southampton Village ferryboat operator
 Ansel Elgort, actor
 Michael J. Fox, actor
 Paul Gibson, Major League Baseball pitcher
 Grenville Goodwin, anthropologist
 Jehiel H. Halsey, lawyer and politician
 Nicoll Halsey, U.S. Representative
 Silas Halsey, U.S. Representative
 Andre Johnson, NFL football player
 Calvin Klein, fashion designer
 David H. Koch, businessman
 Henry Kravis, financier
 Edward Mellon architect
 Steven Mnuchin, financier and US Treasury Secretary
 J. P. Morgan, financier
 Roy Lichtenstein, painter
 Adebayo Ogunlesi, financier and founder of Global Infrastructure Partners
 John Paulson
 Lee Radziwill
 Felix Rohatyn, financier who saved New York City from bankruptcy in the 1970s
 Wilbur Ross, billionaire investor and US Commerce Secretary
 William Salomon
 Arthur Ochs "Punch" Sulzberger Sr., former publisher of The New York Times
 Chuck Scarborough, longstanding news anchor
 Jean Shafiroff, philanthropist and socialite
 George Soros, business magnate, investor, and philanthropist
 Kate Spade
 Howard Stein, financier
 Howard Stern radio personality
 Carlos Eduardo Stolk, diplomat, business magnate
 A. Alfred Taubman, real estate developer and philanthropist
 Foots Walker, NBA basketball player
 Tom Wolfe, author and journalist

Image gallery

References

External links 

 Village of Southampton official website
 Village of Southampton Police Department official website
 The Southampton Press
 Hamptons.com
 Lake Agawam Conservation Association

Villages in New York (state)
Villages in Suffolk County, New York
Populated coastal places in New York (state)